Below is a list of international presidential trips made by Aníbal Cavaco Silva as President of the Portuguese Republic.

2006

2007

2008

2009

2010

2011

2012

2013

2014

2015

See also 
 List of international presidential trips made by António José de Almeida
 List of international presidential trips made by Bernardino Machado
 List of international presidential trips made by Francisco Craveiro Lopes
 List of international presidential trips made by Mário Soares
 List of international presidential trips made by Marcelo Rebelo de Sousa

References

State visits
State visits by Portuguese presidents
Lists of diplomatic trips
Personal timelines
Cavaco Silva, Anibal
2006 in international relations
2007 in international relations
2008 in international relations
2009 in international relations
2010 in international relations
2011 in international relations
2012 in international relations
2013 in international relations
2014 in international relations
2015 in international relations